The Phenomenon is a 2020 documentary film by ufologist James Fox.  It is Fox's third film on the subject, the first two being I Know What I Saw (2009) and Out of the Blue (2003).   The film is narrated by veteran PBS narrator Peter Coyote.

The film features interviews with Former Senate Majority leader Harry Reid, Clinton White House chief of staff John Podesta, former Deputy Undersecretary for Defense Intelligence Christopher Mellon, former New Mexico Governor Bill Richardson, ufologist Jacques Vallee, and journalist Leslie Kean.    In the film, Reid is asked about other evidence and replies "I'm saying most of it hasn't seen the light of day."

The film includes footage or archival interviews with Kenneth Arnold, who coined the phrase "flying saucer" after his 1947 sighting,   Maj. Jesse Marcel of the Roswell incident, Vallee whose research uncovered the "Pentacle Memorandum", witnesses to the Ariel School incident and the Lonnie Zamora incident, and individuals connected to the Rendlesham Forest incident and the Pentagon UFO videos.

See also
Advanced Aerospace Threat Identification Program
Roswell incident

References

External links
 Official site
 

UFO-related films
2020 films
2020 documentary films
American documentary films
2020s English-language films
2020s American films